"Making Your Mind Up" is a song by the British pop group Bucks Fizz. Released in March 1981, it was Bucks Fizz's debut single, the group having been formed just two months earlier. Following its win in the contest, the song reached No. 1 in the UK and several other countries, eventually selling in excess of four million copies. It launched the career of the group, who went on to become one of the biggest selling acts of the 1980s and featured on their debut, self-titled album.

From 2004 to 2007 the BBC used the name Making Your Mind Up for their Eurovision selection show in honour of the song.

Background

Origins 
In late 1980, songwriter Andy Hill composed "Making Your Mind Up" with an eye to entering it into the A Song for Europe finals the following year. Working with his then girlfriend, Nichola Martin, a singer and music publisher, she encouraged him to collaborate with musician John Danter, who she could sign up to her publishing company, therefore owning half the rights of the song (Hill was already signed to another publisher). Martin claims that Danter's input was minimal, the song being essentially a Hill composition. In October 1980, they set about recording a demo of the song featuring the vocals of Hill, Martin and Mike Nolan, a singer Martin had worked with before. In December, the song was chosen out of 591 submitted entries to be one of the eight songs performed in the contest. Martin then realised she had to quickly assemble a group to perform the song for the contest, based around her and Nolan. With the song already entered under the name Bucks Fizz, Martin and future group manager, Jill Shirley recruited Cheryl Baker, Bobby G and Jay Aston to the line-up, with Martin herself dropping out. The song was alongside another Hill/Danter composition, "Have You Ever Been in Love", which would be performed by Martin and Hill under the name Gem.

Martin and Shirley secured a recording deal with RCA Records and Hill spent a week at Mayfair Studios in London with the group recording the song and its B-side. Backing vocals on the record were supplied by Alan Carvell, who also went on to be one of two backing singers in the Eurovision performance. The song was co-published by Paper Music, which was a year-old publishing company owned by Billy Lawrie – himself a songwriter and brother of singer Lulu. Choreographer Chrissie Whickham, a former member of dance troupe Hot Gossip, spent two days with the group working on the dance routine.

The lyrics of the song are largely meaningless, although it can be argued that they are about making the decision to commit to a serious relationship.

Eurovision success 
On 11 March 1981, Bucks Fizz performed "Making Your Mind Up" at the Song for Europe finals and despite being up against favourites and current chart group Liquid Gold, won the contest with ease. From this point, the group undertook much promotion of the song around the UK, including an appearance on Top of the Pops, whereby the single entered the UK charts at 24. It rose to No.5 the following week. As Martin recalls, RCA records were rather indifferent to the group up until now (even releasing the single without a picture sleeve in the UK), but once it entered the charts highly, their attitudes changed suddenly with them agreeing to release an album before they had even won the Eurovision. A promotional video was filmed by the BBC for the Eurovision previews as they had done in previous years. The video depicts the group walking around Harrods department store in London. In line with other previous preview videos, the group do not lipsynch any of the words. This video has never been released on any official Bucks Fizz video or DVD release, being usually substituted by the group's first appearance on Top of the Pops.
 
The 1981 Eurovision Song Contest was staged on 4 April in Dublin. In a close contest throughout the voting procedure with no less than five different songs taking the lead at various stages, "Making Your Mind Up" managed to secure a victory with 136 points, beating second-placed Germany by a small margin of four.

The song is held in affectionate regard by many Eurovision fans, and is generally considered to be a classic example of a pop song from the Contest. Reaction was less favourable to the group's performance of the song, which was considered to be off-key, and led to much criticism that the members were chosen more for their appearance than vocal ability. In addition, the performance is best remembered for the startling moment when the two male members of the group whipped off the skirts of the two girls, only to reveal shorter skirts underneath, a shrewd touch generally considered to have just swung the balance in their favour, and to be a defining moment in the competition's history. Member Cheryl Baker has since commented on their poor performance stating that she sang the song in a higher key to the rest of the group due to nerves. Mike Nolan has said that on the night the microphones got mixed up, with Baker and Jay Aston singing on the lead microphones which had a higher volume.

Aftermath 
"Making Your Mind Up" went to No.1 in the UK following the victory and remained there for three weeks, becoming one of the biggest selling songs of the year. It also saw the group in high demand throughout Europe, with the single hitting No.1 in many countries and charting in the top ten in Australia. The record eventually sold four million copies worldwide.  The single began a run of 20 UK hits for Bucks Fizz and was quickly followed up by "Piece of the Action" and debut album, Bucks Fizz. At the end of the decade, "Making Your Mind Up" was No.47 in the UK top selling singles of the 1980s. Despite the success of the song, fans of the group don't consider it to be a good representation of their work, while member Cheryl Baker doesn't rate it as one of their best songs. The song is still well liked by members of the general public and remains the group's best-remembered song. In 2013 BBC Radio 2 listeners voted "Making Your Mind Up" as the best-ever British Eurovision entry.

In the Eurovision, the song was succeeded as a UK entry by "One Step Further" by Bardo, who were managed by the same team as Bucks Fizz. As a winner, it was succeeded by "Ein Bisschen Frieden", sung by Germany's Nicole. The song title has also given the name to the UK selection process for the Eurovision Song Contest.

The now famous skirt rip of the dance routine (which was mirrored by Mick Jagger and Tina Turner at 1985's Live Aid) has appeared in many contests since that time – most notably as part of 's Marie N's performance of "I Wanna", which won for Latvia, in 2002.

"Making Your Mind Up" was spoofed by many artists following its success, with alternative titles: "Me vas a volver loco (You're Going to Drive Me Crazy)" (by Spanish group Parchís), "Rock and Roll Cowboy" by German singer Maggie Mae and "It's Only a Wind Up" by British comedy group Brown Ale.

Track listing 
 "Making Your Mind Up" (Andy Hill / John Danter) (2.39)
 "Don't Stop" (Andy Hill / Nichola Martin) (4.08)

Chart positions

Weekly charts

Year-end charts

In the UK, "Making Your Mind Up" was certified Gold by the British Phonographic Industry (BPI).

See also 
 United Kingdom in the Eurovision Song Contest 1981

References 

1981 songs
1981 debut singles
Bucks Fizz songs
Eurovision songs of the United Kingdom
Eurovision songs of 1981
1981 in the United Kingdom
European Hot 100 Singles number-one singles
UK Singles Chart number-one singles
Dutch Top 40 number-one singles
Irish Singles Chart number-one singles
Ultratop 50 Singles (Flanders) number-one singles
Number-one singles in Austria
Number-one singles in Denmark
Number-one singles in Israel
Songs written by Andy Hill (composer)
Eurovision Song Contest winning songs
RCA Records singles